The 2004 Kansas State Wildcats football team represented Kansas State University in the 2004 NCAA Division I-A football season.  The team's head football coach was Bill Snyder.  The Wildcats played their home games in KSU Stadium. The team finished the season with a record of 4–7 and a Big 12 Conference record of 2–6.

Schedule

Roster

Game summaries

Texas A&M

#2 Oklahoma

Nebraska

Statistics

Scores by quarter

Team

Offense

Rushing

Passing

Receiving

2005 NFL Draft

References

Kansas State
Kansas State Wildcats football seasons
Kansas State Wildcats football